Wesley Chapel A.M.E Church is a historic church at 508 W. Fourth in Georgetown, Texas.

It was built in 1904 and added to the National Register in 1986.

See also

National Register of Historic Places listings in Williamson County, Texas
Recorded Texas Historic Landmarks in Williamson County

References

African Methodist Episcopal churches in Texas
Churches on the National Register of Historic Places in Texas
Carpenter Gothic church buildings in Texas
Churches completed in 1904
20th-century Methodist church buildings in the United States
Churches in Williamson County, Texas
National Register of Historic Places in Williamson County, Texas
Recorded Texas Historic Landmarks